Yaroslavtsev is a Russian surname. Notable people with the surname include:

Grigory Yaroslavtsev (born 1987), Russian computer scientist
Yevgeni Yaroslavtsev (born 1982), Russian footballer

See also
 Yaroslavtsev Log

Russian-language surnames